Hlaváč (feminine: Hlaváčová) is a Czech surname. Notable people include:
 Jan Hlaváč (born 1976), Czech ice hockey player
 Jana Hlaváčová (born 1938), Czech actress
 Jana Galíková-Hlaváčová (born 1963), Czech orienteerer
 Miloslav Hlaváč (1893–1975), Czech sport shooter
 Vít Hlaváč (born 1997), Czech racewalker
 Yvetta Hlaváčová (born 1975), Czech swimmer

See also
 
 

Czech-language surnames